Thomas Alleyn (died 27 March 1631) was a prominent seventeenth century London citizen and the first Master of the College of God's Gift.

Early life
He was born the cousin of Edward Alleyn in London. He married and had one son and two daughters.

Career
Prior to his appointment, Thomas Alleyn had become a citizen of London and was a barber-surgeon of London.
When Edward Alleyn laid out the Deed of Foundation of the College of God's Gift in Dulwich, which was soon colloquially referred to as "Dulwich College", he stipulated that the Master and Warden should always be unmarried and of Alleyn's blood, and surname, and if the former was impossible then at least of Alleyn’s surname.

Thomas met the criteria of being of Edward Alleyn's blood and surname, although he was married. Edward Alleyn named him in the Deed of Foundation although such was Edward Alleyn's continued involvement in his charitable concern that Thomas did not assume office until Edward Alleyn's death in 1626.

He died on 27 March 1631 and was succeeded in the post by his cousin Matthias Alleyn who had served as Warden in the period that Thomas had been Master.

References

1631 deaths
Year of birth missing
Masters of the College of God's Gift